The Astoria–Megler Bridge is a steel cantilever through truss bridge in the northwest United States that spans the lower Columbia River, between Astoria, Oregon, and Point Ellice near Megler, Washington. Opened , in 1966, it is the longest continuous truss bridge in North America.

History

Ferry service between Astoria and the Washington side of the Columbia River began in 1926. The Oregon Department of Transportation purchased the ferry service in 1946. This ferry service did not operate during inclement weather and the half-hour travel time caused delays. In order to allow faster and more reliable crossings near the mouth of the river, a bridge was planned. The bridge was built jointly by the Oregon Department of Transportation and Washington State Department of Transportation.

Construction on the structure began on November 5, 1962, and the concrete piers were cast at Tongue Point,  upriver. The steel structure was built in segments at Vancouver, Washington,  upriver, then barged downstream where hydraulic jacks lifted them into place. The bridge opened to traffic on July 29, 1966, marking the completion of U.S. Route 101 and becoming the seventh major bridge built by Oregon in the 1950s–1960s; ferry service ended the night before. On August 27, 1966, Governors Mark Hatfield of Oregon and Dan Evans of Washington dedicated the bridge by cutting a ceremonial ribbon. The four-day ceremony was celebrated by 30,000 attendees who participated in parades, drives, and a marathon boat race from Portland to Astoria. The cost of the project was $24 million, equivalent to $ million in  dollars, and was paid for by tolls that were removed on December 24, 1993, more than two years early.

Details

As of 2004, an average of 7,100 vehicles per day used the Astoria–Megler Bridge. Designed by William Adair Bugge  construction of the cantilever truss bridge was completed by the DeLong Corporation, the American Bridge Company, and Pomeroy Gerwick.

The south end is at  beside what used to be the toll plaza, at the end of a  inclined ramp which goes through a full 360-degree loop while gaining elevation over land to provide almost  of clearance over the shipping channel. Since most of the northern portion of the bridge is over shallow, non-navigable water, it is low to the water.

Repainting the bridge was planned for May 2009 through 2011 and budgeted at $20 million, to be shared by the states of Oregon and Washington. A four-year planned paint stripping and repainting project was planned for March 2012 through December 2016.

Pedestrians
Normally, only motor vehicles and bicycles are allowed on the bridge—not pedestrians. There is no sidewalk and the shoulders are too narrow for pedestrians adjacent to  traffic. However, one day a year—usually in October—the bridge is host to the Great Columbia Crossing. Participants are taken by shuttle to the Washington side, from where they run or walk to the Oregon side on a  route across the bridge. Motor traffic is allowed to use only one lane (of two lanes) and is advised to expect delays during the two-hour event. For the first time, during the 2018 event, the Oregon Department of Transportation announced that the bridge would be closed to motor traffic.

Popular culture
The bridge itself is featured prominently in the movies Short Circuit, Kindergarten Cop, Free Willy 2: The Adventure Home and The Goonies. It stands in for the doomed fictional Madison Bridge in Irwin Allen's 1979 made-for-TV disaster movie The Night the Bridge Fell Down. Songwriter Sufjan Stevens most likely references the bridge in his song "Should Have Known Better" off his 2015 album Carrie & Lowell as a metaphor for dealing with his grief from the death of his mother.

Images

See also

List of bridges documented by the Historic American Engineering Record in Oregon
List of bridges documented by the Historic American Engineering Record in Washington (state)
List of bridges on U.S. Route 101 in Oregon

References

External links

funbeach.com: Astoria–Megler Bridge
oldoregon.com: Astoria–Megler Bridge
Great Columbia Crossing

Bridges over the Columbia River
Road bridges in Oregon
Road bridges in Washington (state)
Bridges completed in 1966
Continuous truss bridges in the United States
Buildings and structures in Astoria, Oregon
Transportation buildings and structures in Pacific County, Washington
U.S. Route 101
1966 establishments in Oregon
Former toll bridges in Oregon
Former toll bridges in Washington (state)
Historic American Engineering Record in Oregon
Historic American Engineering Record in Washington (state)
Bridges of the United States Numbered Highway System
1966 establishments in Washington (state)
Steel bridges in the United States
Cantilever bridges in the United States
Transportation buildings and structures in Clatsop County, Oregon